Manderson can refer to:

Places
 Manderson, Wyoming
 Manderson, South Dakota

Other uses
 Manderson (surname)
 USS Manderson Victory (AK-230), cargo ship acquired by the U.S. Navy during World War II